Johann Georg Platzer (1704–1761) was a prolific Austrian Rococo painter and draughtsman.

Life and career

Platzer was born in Eppan in the County of Tyrol, and came from a family of painters. He painted primarily historical and mythical scenes. The Joanneum Alte Galerie in Graz houses the largest collection of Platzer's work under a single roof.  Platzer worked with his uncle as a court painter in Passau. He returned to Eppan where he continued to work until his death in 1761.

See also
 List of Orientalist artists

References

Further reading 
 
 
 

1704 births
1761 deaths
People from Eppan an der Weinstraße
18th-century Austrian painters
18th-century Austrian male artists
Austrian male painters
Court painters
Academy of Fine Arts Vienna alumni
Orientalist painters